HMS E31 was a British E class submarine built by Scotts, Greenock. She was laid down in December 1914, commissioned on 8 January 1916, and sold for scrap on 6 September 1922.

Design
She was powered by two  Vickers eight-cylinder two-stroke diesel engines and two  electric motors.

E31 was armed with a 12-pounder  QF gun mounted forward of the conning tower. She had five 18 inch (450 mm) torpedo tubes, two in the bow, one either side amidships, and one in the stern; a total of 10 torpedoes were carried.

E-Class submarines had wireless systems with  power ratings; in some submarines, these were later upgraded to  systems by removing a midship torpedo tube. Their maximum design depth was  although in service some reached depths of below . Some submarines contained Fessenden oscillator systems.

Crew
Her complement was three officers and 28 men.

Service history
HMS E31 was involved in a curious incident when she was operating with the sea plane carrier  in the North Sea in an air raid on the Zeppelin sheds at Tondern on 4 May 1916. While on a mission, LZ 32 was spotted by light cruisers  and  who opened fire on the airship. Just as they were doing this HMS E31 was operating with the sea plane carrier  in the North Sea in an air raid on the Zeppelin sheds at Tondern on 4 May 1916. E31 surfaced and spotted the airship, but being vulnerable on the surface, the sub dived to avoid attack. E31 then surfaced just in time to get in the fatal shot and brought the Zeppelin down. HMS E31 then proceeded to rescue seven survivors from the crew of LZ 32.

References

Bibliography
 
 
 
 

 

British E-class submarines of the Royal Navy
Ships built on the River Clyde
1915 ships
World War I submarines of the United Kingdom
Royal Navy ship names